Wayne Tuck Jr. (born May 12, 1976) is a Canadian curler from Strathroy, Ontario.

Tuck is a three time provincial mixed champion, having won the Ontario provincial mixed championship at the 2002, 2009 and 2017 events. At the 2002 Canadian Mixed Curling Championship, he skipped the Ontario team to a 10-1 round robin record, but they lost both their playoff matches, including the final to Nova Scotia, skipped by Mark Dacey. The 2009 Canadian Mixed Curling Championship was another successful event for Tuck, who finished the round robin with an 8-3 record. They lost again in the final, this time to Manitoba, skipped by Sean Grassie. At the 2017 Canadian Mixed Curling Championship, Tuck led his team to an undefeated record in the preliminary rounds (10-0), but lost in the semi-final to Manitoba. They would rebound to win the bronze medal, defeating Saskatchewan.

Tuck also won the Dominion Regalia Silver Tankard in 1997, skipping one of the two rinks for the champion Ilderton Curling Club.

Tuck is married to Kim Tuck (née Veale), who played third for him in all three of his provincial mixed championships. The pair won the 2014 Canadian Mixed Doubles Curling Trials and represented Canada at the 2014 World Mixed Doubles Curling Championship where they lost in the round of 16. The pair played in the 2018 Canadian Mixed Doubles Curling Olympic Trials, but finished last in their group with a 1-7 record. Later that season, the pair would win their first provincial mixed doubles title.

Personal life
Tuck is employed as a "curling stone technician" for Canada Curling Stone Co. He and Kim Tuck have two children.

Wayne and Kim are co-founders and co-owners of Canada Curling Stone Co. Stones made by this company are used by Curling Canada at its major championships, including the Scotties Tournament of Hearts and Brier. Their rocks made an appearance in the 2002 movie Men With Brooms.

Teams and events

Men's

Mixed

Mixed doubles

References

External links

 Video: 

Curlers from Ontario
Living people
People from Strathroy-Caradoc
Canadian male curlers
Canadian mixed doubles curling champions
1976 births
Curlers from Winnipeg
Canada Cup (curling) participants